The Turmoil is a 1916 silent film drama based on a novel by Booth Tarkington. It was released by Metro Pictures and stars stage actress Valli Valli.

This film has been preserved by MGM.

Cast
Valli Valli – Mary Vertrees
George LeGuere – Bibbs Sheridan
Charles Prince – James Sheridan, Sr.
Florida Kingsley – Mrs. Vertrees
Frank DeVernon – Mr. Vertrees
Kate Jepson – Mrs. James Sheridan
Ferdinand Tidmarsh – James Sheridan, Jr.
Robert Stowe Gill – Roscoe Sheridan
Ilean Hume – Edith Sheridan
Frederic Sumner – Robert Lamhorn
William Anker – Dr. George Gurney

unbilled
Peggy Hopkins Joyce – Unhappy Wife

References

External links

Films directed by Edgar Jones
1916 films
American silent feature films
Films based on American novels
Films based on works by Booth Tarkington
1916 drama films
Silent American drama films
American black-and-white films
Metro Pictures films
1910s American films